The following outline is provided as an overview of and topical guide to Himachal Pradesh:

Himachal Pradesh –  state in North India. Hima means snow in Sanskrit, and the literal meaning of the state's name is in the lap of the Himalayas. It was named by Acharya Diwakar Datt Sharma, one of the most eminent Sanskrit scholars of Himachal Pradesh.

General reference

Names 
 Common English name: Himachal Pradesh
 
 Meaning: "Snow-laden Province"
 Official English name(s): Himachal Pradesh
 Nickname(s): 
 Adjectival(s): Himachali
 Demonym(s): Himachalis

Rankings (amongst India's states) 

 by population: 21st
 by area (2011 census): 18th
 by crime rate: 15th
 by gross domestic product (GDP) (2014): 21st
by Human Development Index (HDI): 
by life expectancy at birth: 
by literacy rate:

Geography of Himachal Pradesh 

Geography of Himachal Pradesh
 Himachal Pradesh is: an Indian state
 Population of Himachal Pradesh: 
 Area of Himachal Pradesh:  
 Atlas of Himachal Pradesh

Location of Himachal Pradesh 
 Himachal Pradesh is situated within the following regions:
 Northern Hemisphere
 Eastern Hemisphere
 Eurasia
 Asia
 South Asia
 Indian subcontinent
 India
 North India
 Time zone:  Indian Standard Time (UTC+05:30)

Environment of Himachal Pradesh 

 Climate of Himachal Pradesh
 Protected areas of Himachal Pradesh
 Biosphere reserves in Himachal Pradesh
 National parks of Himachal Pradesh
 Wildlife of Himachal Pradesh

Natural geographic features of Himachal Pradesh 

 Lakes of Himachal Pradesh

Regions of Himachal Pradesh

Ecoregions of Himachal Pradesh

Administrative divisions of Himachal Pradesh

Districts of Himachal Pradesh 

 Districts of Himachal Pradesh

Municipalities of Himachal Pradesh 

 Cities of Himachal Pradesh
 Capital of Himachal Pradesh: Capital of Himachal Pradesh

Demography of Himachal Pradesh 

Demographics of Himachal Pradesh

Government and politics of Himachal Pradesh 

Politics of Himachal Pradesh

 Form of government: Indian state government (parliamentary system of representative democracy)
 Capital of Himachal Pradesh: Capital of Himachal Pradesh
 Elections in Himachal Pradesh

Union government in Himachal Pradesh 
 Rajya Sabha members from Himachal Pradesh
 Himachal Pradesh Congress Committee
 Indian general election, 2019 (Himachal Pradesh)

Branches of the government of Himachal Pradesh 

Government of Himachal Pradesh

Executive branch of the government of Himachal Pradesh 

 Head of state: Governor of Himachal Pradesh, 
 Head of government: Chief Minister of Himachal Pradesh,

Legislative branch of the government of Himachal Pradesh 

Himachal Pradesh Legislative Assembly
 Constituencies of Himachal Pradesh Legislative Assembly

Judicial branch of the government of Himachal Pradesh

Law and order in Himachal Pradesh 

 Law enforcement in Himachal Pradesh
 Himachal Pradesh Police

History of Himachal Pradesh 

History of Himachal Pradesh

History of Himachal Pradesh, by period

Prehistoric Himachal Pradesh

Ancient Himachal Pradesh

Medieval Himachal Pradesh

Colonial Himachal Pradesh

Contemporary Himachal Pradesh

History of Himachal Pradesh, by region

History of Himachal Pradesh, by subject

Culture of Himachal Pradesh 

Culture of Himachal Pradesh
 Architecture of Himachal Pradesh
 Cuisine of Himachal Pradesh
 Languages of Himachal Pradesh
 Monuments in Himachal Pradesh
 Monuments of National Importance in Himachal Pradesh
 State Protected Monuments in Himachal Pradesh
 World Heritage Sites in Himachal Pradesh

Art in Himachal Pradesh 

 Music of Himachal Pradesh

People of Himachal Pradesh 

 People from Himachal Pradesh

Religion in Himachal Pradesh 

Religion in Himachal Pradesh
 Buddhism in Himachal Pradesh

Sports in Himachal Pradesh 

Sports in Himachal Pradesh
 Cricket in Himachal Pradesh
 Himachal Pradesh Cricket Association
 Himachal Pradesh cricket team
 Football in Himachal Pradesh
 Himachal Pradesh Football Association
 Himachal Pradesh State League
 Himachal Pradesh football team

Symbols of Himachal Pradesh 

Symbols of Himachal Pradesh
 State animal: Snow Leopard
 State bird: Western Tragopan
 State flower: Pink Rhododendron
 State seal: Seal of Himachal Pradesh
 State tree: Deodar Cedar

Economy and infrastructure of Himachal Pradesh 

Economy of Himachal Pradesh
 Agriculture in Himachal Pradesh
 Transport in Himachal Pradesh

Education in Himachal Pradesh 

Education in Himachal Pradesh
 Institutions of higher education in Himachal Pradesh

Health in Himachal Pradesh 

Health in Himachal Pradesh

See also 

 Outline of India

References

External links 

 Official website of Himachal Pradesh government

Himachal Pradesh
Himachal Pradesh